This is a list of career statistics of American tennis player CoCo Vandeweghe since her professional debut in 2008. Vandeweghe has won two singles and four WTA doubles titles on the WTA Tour, one singles WTA Challenger and one doubles Challenger, as well as two ITF singles and six doubles ITF tournaments. In 2018 she won her first Grand Slam title; partnering Ash Barty in women's doubles at the US Open. She also reached two Grand Slam mixed-doubles finals in 2016 at the Australian Open and the US Open.

Performance timelines

Only main-draw results in WTA Tour, Grand Slam tournaments, Fed Cup/Billie Jean King Cup and Olympic Games are included in win–loss records.

Singles
Current after the 2023 ATX Open

Doubles

Mixed doubles

Significant finals

Grand Slam finals

Doubles: 1 (1 title)

Mixed doubles: 2 (2 runner-ups)

Premier Mandatory/Premier 5 finals

Doubles: 3 (2 titles, 1 runner-up)

WTA Elite Trophy finals

Singles: 1 (1 runner-up)

WTA career finals

Singles: 6 (2 titles, 4 runner–ups)

Doubles: 6 (4 titles, 2 runner–ups)

Team competition

Fed Cup/Billie Jean King Cup participation
Current through the 2020 Fed Cup Qualifying Round

Singles (8–4)

Doubles (5–1)

WTA Challenger finals

Singles: 2 (1 title, 1 runner-up)

Doubles: 1 (1 title)

ITF Circuit finals

Singles: 6 (2 titles, 4 runner–ups)

Doubles: 6 (6 titles)

Head-to-head records

Record against top-10 players
Vandeweghe's record against players who at some point in their careers have been ranked in the top 10 (not necessarily when they faced each other). Active players are in boldface.

No. 1 wins

Top 10 wins

Notes

References

External links
 CoCo Vandeweghe at the Women's Tennis Association
 CoCo Vandeweghe at the International Tennis Federation

Vandeweghe, Coco